Luchinskoye is a rural locality (a village) in Tolpukhovskoye Rural Settlement, Sobinsky District, Vladimir Oblast, Russia. The population was 143 as of 2010. There are 4 streets.

Geography 
Luchinskoye is located 26 km north of Sobinka (the district's administrative centre) by road. Bezvodnoye is the nearest rural locality.

References 

Rural localities in Sobinsky District